Palmiro Masciarelli (born 7 January 1953) is an Italian former professional racing cyclist. He rode in one edition of the Tour de France, nine editions of the Giro d'Italia and one edition of the Vuelta a España.

References

External links
 

1953 births
Living people
Italian male cyclists
Sportspeople from Pescara
Cyclists from Abruzzo